Robert Tiffany OBE, FRCN (30 December 1942 – February 1993) was a British nurse. He was a founding member of the International Society of Nurses in Cancer Care (ISNCC) and initiated the Biannual International Cancer Nursing Conference.  He was also a founding member of the European Oncology Nursing Society and first President of the Society from 1985 to 1987.

The Tiffany Lectureship was founded to inform and inspire oncology nurses worldwide.

He was made a Fellow of the Royal College of Nursing in 1982.

Death
Robert Tiffany died in St. Bartholomew's Hospital, London, of bronchial pneumonia and renal failure, aged 50.

Legacy
The Robert Tiffany Annual Nursing Lectureship which honours those within cancer nursing who have made a significant contribution to cancer practice, education, research or management at a national, regional and/or international level
The Robert Tiffany International Nursing Award
The Robert Tiffany Ward at the Royal Marsden Hospital

References

External links
http://www.nursing-standard.co.uk/nurseawards/robert.asp
http://www.richardwellsresearch.com/richardwells/People/robert.htm

Nurses from London
British nursing administrators
Deaths from pneumonia in England
Deaths from kidney failure
Fellows of the Royal College of Nursing
Officers of the Order of the British Empire
1942 births
1993 deaths
Place of birth missing
Male nurses
British nurses